The Union Football Club Manila or Union Internacional Manila F.C. is a Filipino football club based in Manila. It was established in 1996 as a recreational football club associated with Spanish firm Unión Fenosa. The club played at the United Football League (UFL).

The club made its first appearance in the first season of the UFL in 2010 in the first division. The club played in the second division from the 2011 to 2013 seasons.

History
Union International Manila was established in 1996. Its foundation is associated with the Spanish company Unión Fenosa which brought in consultants from Spain and South America to he Philippines. Initially, the club's players held informal football matches at the Jolly Field, a baseball venue inside Meralco's compound. The first "official" match of the club under the "Unión Fenosa" name was in 1997 against the Philippine women's national team. The club was led by head coach Venezuelan Jose Lupo in that match. Unión Fenosa continued to organize games at the Jolly Field and joined various football tournaments including futsal, 7-a-side, a beach soccer competitions.

The club renamed themselves as Union F.C. by September 2000 when it joined the Ateneo Football Tournament due to most of its players not being affiliated with Unión Fenosa by that time. Lupo left for Spain in 2003 with Uruguayan Esteban Alonso succeeding him as head coach and manager. Alonso left in December 2005 who was succeeded by Dominic Samson, who became Union's first Filipino coach. Under Samson's watch, the club was reinforced by several Filipino players and led Union in the UFL Championships in 2006 and 2007. In 2009, Rafael Rodriguez took over as coach.

Union joined the semi-professional United Football League in 2010 finishing third in the league table. Despite their finish, they self relegated to the second division for the 2011 season. They played in the UFL Division 2 until the 2013 season.

Records

Key
Tms. = Number of teams
Pos. = Position in league
TBD  = To be determined
DNQ  = Did not qualify
Note: Performances of the club indicated here was after the UFL Division 1 created (as a semi-pro league) in 2009.

Honors

Terry Razon Copa Filipina
Winners (1): 2006

UFL Division 1
Champions (2): 2006, 2007
Third Place (1): 2010

UFL Division 2
Runners-up (1): 2013

References

Association football clubs established in 1996
Football clubs in the Philippines
1996 establishments in the Philippines
Sports teams in Metro Manila

es:Union FC